Vrouwenoogen  is a 1912 Dutch silent drama film directed by Caroline van Dommelen.

Cast
Caroline van Dommelen		
Louis van Dommelen		
Jan van Dommelen		
Ansje van Dommelen-Kapper		
Cato Mertens-de Jaeger

External links 
 

1912 films
Dutch silent feature films
Dutch black-and-white films
1912 drama films
Films directed by Caroline van Dommelen
Dutch drama films
Silent drama films